Roy C. Jensen (August 7, 1909 – March 6, 2011) was an American farmer and politician.

Born in Willmar, Minnesota, Jensen owned a dairy farm near Priam, Minnesota. He was also president of a cooperative telephone company. Jensen also served on the school and township boards. He served in the Minnesota House of Representatives from 1951 until 1954 and was a Republican. He died in Willmar, Minnesota.

Notes

1909 births
2011 deaths
People from Willmar, Minnesota
Businesspeople from Minnesota
American centenarians
Men centenarians
American Lutherans
Republican Party members of the Minnesota House of Representatives
20th-century American businesspeople
20th-century Lutherans